Bedellia somnulentella, the sweet potato leaf miner, is a moth in the family Bedelliidae.

Description
The wingspan is 8–10 mm.

The larvae feed on Calystegia pubescens, Calystegia sepium, Convolvulus althaeoides, Convolvulus arvensis, Convolvulus siculus, Convolvulus tricolour, Ipomoea batatas and Ipomoea purpurea. They mine the leaves of their host plant. The mine starts as a narrow tortuous corridor with a central frass line, that often cuts off part of the leaf. Later, larvae leave the mine and begin to make a series of full depth fleck mines. Pupation takes place outside the leaf. The pupa is attached to a leaf without a cocoon.

Distribution
Originally from Asia, where its food plants are found, it has reached a nearly cosmopolitan distribution and has been recorded from Russia, Ukraine, Georgia, southern Kazakhstan, Kirgizia, Uzbekistan, nearly all of Europe, the Middle East, Africa, India, Japan, North America, Australia, New Zealand and Oceania.

External links
 A Review of the Lyonetiid Moths (Lepidoptera, Lyonetiidae): II. The Subfamilies Lyonetiinae and Bedelliinae
 bladmineerders.nl
 UKmoths
 
 

Bedelliidae
Leaf miners
Moths described in 1847
Moths of Africa
Moths of Asia
Moths of Australia
Moths of Europe
Moths of Japan
Moths of Mauritius
Moths of New Zealand
Taxa named by Philipp Christoph Zeller